Lasenby is a surname. Notable people with the surname include:

Jack Lasenby (1931–2019), New Zealand writer
Paul Lasenby (born 1975), English cyclist

See also
Arthur Lasenby Liberty (1843–1917), British businessman
Lazenby (disambiguation)